Susan Lontine is an American politician who served in the Colorado House of Representatives from the 1st district as a member of the Democratic Party.

Lontine was born in Lakeland, Florida, and educated at the University of Central Florida. She served as a precinct captain for four years, worked in Representative Jeanne Labuda's office, and as the chief of staff for Senator Irene Aguilar. She was elected to the state house in the 2014 election. During her tenure in the state house she served as the chair of the Health and Insurance Committee and accused Senator Larry Crowder of sexual harassment.

Early life and education

Lontine was born in Lakeland, Florida, and graduated with a Bachelor of Arts degree in journalism at the University of Central Florida. She moved to Pennsylvania and married Chuck Lontine, with whom she had two children, and later moved to Denver in 1996. She was a precinct captain in the 1st district of the Colorado House of Representatives for four years, worked in Representative Jeanne Labuda's office, and as the chief of staff for Senator Irene Aguilar.

Colorado House of Representatives

Lontine ran for the Democratic nomination for a seat in the state house from the 1st district and won in the 2014 election against Republican nominee Raymond Garcia, Libertarian nominee David Hein, and independent candidate Jon Biggerstaff. She defeated Garcia in the 2016 election. She defeated Republican nominee Alysia Padilla and Libertarian nominee Darrell Dinges in the 2018 election. She won reelection in the 2020 election against Republican nominee Samantha Koch.

During her tenure in the state house she served on the Veterans and Military Affairs committee and as chair of the Health and Insurance Committee. She accused Senator Larry Crowder of sexual harassment and filed a formal complaint against him in November 2017, stating that he had pinched her butt in 2015, and made an inappropriate sexual comment. She supported Hillary Clinton during the 2016 Democratic presidential primaries and Elizabeth Warren in the 2020 primaries.

Political positions

Lontine voted against anti-BDS legislation stating that it was a violation of the First Amendment to the United States Constitution. She supported removing the phrase "illegal aliens" from existing laws. She received an A rating from NARAL Pro-Choice America. Lontine was among thirty-seven legislators who endorsed a letter in 2018, calling for Planned Parenthood to allow for their workers to form an union.

Electoral history

References

21st-century American politicians
21st-century American women politicians
Living people
Democratic Party members of the Colorado House of Representatives
University of Central Florida alumni
Politicians from Denver
Women state legislators in Colorado
Year of birth missing (living people)